Cox's Bazar Beach, located at Cox's Bazar, Bangladesh, is the longest natural sea beach in the world running  and 5th longest beach after Praia do Cassino of Brazil,  Padre Island on the US Gulf Coast, Eighty Mile Beach in Western Australia, and Ninety Mile Beach of Australia. It is the top tourist destination of Bangladesh.

Geography
Quicksand is a danger during ebb tide.

History

From the early 9th century the greater Chittagong area, including Cox's Bazar, was under the rule of Arakan kings  until its conquest by the Mughals in 1666 AD. When the Mughal Prince Shah Shuja was passing through the hilly terrain of the present-day Cox's Bazar on his way to Arakan, he was attracted to its scenic and captivating beauty. He commanded his forces to camp there. His retinue of one thousand palanquins stopped there for some time. A place named Dulahazara, meaning "one thousand palanquins," still exists in the area.

After the Mughals, the place came under the control of the Tipras and the Arakanese, followed by the Portuguese and then the British.

The name Cox's Bazar originated from the name of a British East India Company officer, Captain Hiram Cox, who was appointed as the Superintendent of Palonki (today's Cox's Bazar) outpost. He succeeded Warren Hastings, who became the Governor of Bengal following the British East India Company Act in 1773. Cox embarked upon the task of rehabilitation and settlement of the Arakanese refugees in the area. He rehabilitated many refugees in the area, but died in 1799 before finishing his work. To commemorate him, a market was established and named after him, called Cox's Bazar. Cox's Bazar was first established in 1854 and became a municipality in 1869.

Just after the end of British rule in 1947, Cox's Bazar became part of East Pakistan. Captain Advocate Fazlul Karim, the first post-independence chairman of Cox's Bazar Municipality, established the Tamarisk Forest along the beach. He wanted to attract tourists as well as to protect the beach from tsunamis. He donated much of his father-in-law's and his own lands as sites for constructing a public library and a town hall. Karim was inspired to build Cox's Bazar as a tourist spot after seeing beaches of Bombay and Karachi, and was a resort pioneer in developing Cox's Bazar as a destination. Karim established a maternity hospital, the stadium and the drainage system by procuring grants from the Ford Foundation and Rockefeller Foundation through correspondence. T. H. Matthews, the principal of the Dacca Engineering College (1949~1954), was a friend who had helped him in these fundraising efforts. Engineer Chandi Charan Das was the government civil engineer who worked on all these projects.

Parts of the beach

Kolatoli Point

Kolatoli Point is an important part of Cox's Bazar beach situated near Dolphine intersection of Cox's Bazar city. Many hotel and restaurant are reside in this area. Buses stop near this point. Before restrictions of government, stoppage of bus was the beach area of Kolatoli. Now all bus stop near Dolphine moure. Sayeman Beach Resort is located on the shores of this stretch of beach.

Sugandha Point
Sugandha Point situated from the north of Kolatoli point. There is a Burmese Market that is famous in Cox's bazar. There were sea food restaurants but demolished by government. It has fly dining restaurant too.

Laboni Point

Laboni point is another famous part of the beach. People mainly gather mostly here. This part is best for horse riding, speed-boat riding etc.

Darianagar Beach
Darianagar is situated near Himchhori waterfall and hilltrack. It is a beach with waterways flowing through it. Darianagar is well known for parasailing too.

Inani Beach

Inani Beach is an  sea beach in Ukhia Upazila of Cox's Bazar District, Bangladesh. It has a lot of coral stones, which are very sharp. These coral stones look black and green, and they are found in summer or rainy seasons. Patuartek beach is situated nearby.

Teknaf Section

Teknaf Beach situated in Teknaf Upazila of Cox's bazar district. This is unlike of main part of the beach. Teknaf beach is more wild than main beach and surrounded by teknaf peninsula mangrove. This section is divided by many beaches. Other beaches of the section are:
 Shamlapur Beach (Baharchara Beach)
 Shilakhali Beach
 Hajampara Beach
 Shapuree Island Beach

Tourism
According to a survey of Bangladesh Bureau of Statistics in December 2021, each year 17% of the citizens of the country visit Cox's Bazar, which is about 3 million. However, the number of trips to Cox's Bazar beach is declining due to various issues.

Controversy
In 2021 an area of Cox's Bazar beach was declared a women-only zone, but the government reversed the decision after controversy.

Gallery

See also
 Cox's Bazar–Teknaf Marine Drive
 St. Martin's Island
 List of beaches in Bangladesh
 Tourism in Bangladesh

References

External Links

 Places of interest in Cox's Bazar : Cox's Bazar Development Authority 

Beach
5
 
Tourism in Bangladesh
Tourist attractions in Chittagong Division
Tourist attractions in Bangladesh
Seaside resorts in Bangladesh